Today is the fourth album by electronic music producer Junkie XL (Tom Holkenborg). It was released in 2006 and features vocals by Nathan Mader and acoustic and electric guitars by Holkenborg on several tracks.

Honey is dedicated to and named after the mother of Holkenborg's former fiance.

Track listing

Miscellaneous
 The song "Today" was featured on the soundtrack for the video games Burnout Legends and Burnout Revenge, as well as ESPN commercials for Major League Soccer in 2008.
 Junkie XL's former fiance Carolyn sang on the track "I've Got a Xerox to Copy."
 Part of melody in "Even In This Moment" sounds the same when played backwards.

Junkie XL albums